Brat is an action puzzle video game developed by Foursfield and published by Image Works for the Amiga and Atari ST in 1991.

Gameplay
Brat is an isometric action puzzle in which the player guides Nathan, the brat of the title, through a series of twelve levels. The isometric landscape scrolls up-screen, imposing a time limit on each level. Whilst Nathan automatically walks forwards at the same rate, if he is diverted he will begin to lag behind. If the screen catches up with him, the player loses one of three lives and must restart the level. Nathan is not controlled directly: the player must place icons onto the level to guide his movement. There are a variety of items that can be collected by Nathan, then later placed by the player to bypass certain obstacles: deadly spring toys can be suppressed with a lead weight, and building blocks can bridge gaps, for example.

Reception

Brat was met with moderate critical success, drawing comparison with Lemmings. Reviewers praised the game's intuitive interface, challenging but achievable puzzles, clear graphical style, and original, addictive gameplay. However, the game was criticised for its unforgiving nature when the player makes slight errors, as was some excessive disk access. CU Amiga found the gameplay to be "tedious and long-winded", the level restarts too frustrating, and the puzzle elements compared unfavourably with Lemmings. Amiga Power criticized the design of the titular character, describing him as nauseating and irritating.

References

External links
Brat at Atari Mania
Brat at Lemon Amiga

1991 video games
Amiga games
Atari ST games
Puzzle video games
Video games about children
Video games developed in the United Kingdom
Single-player video games
Image Works games